Amphorina is a genus of aeolid nudibranch in the family Eubranchidae.

Species
Species within the genus Amphorina include:

 Amphorina andra Korshunova, Malmberg, Prkić, Petani, Fletcher, Lundin, Martynov, 2020
 Amphorina farrani (Alder and Hancock, 1844) 
 Amphorina linensis (Garcia-Gomez, Cervera & Garcia, 1990)
 Amphorina pallida (Alder and Hancock, 1842) 
 Amphorina viriola Korshunova, Malmberg, Prkić, Petani, Fletcher, Lundin, Martynov, 2020

Species brought into synonymy
 Amphorina alberti Quatrefages, 1844: synonym of Amphorina farrani (Alder and Hancock, 1844)
 Amphorina antarctica (Eliot, 1907): synonym of Galvinella antarctica Eliot, 1907
 Amphorina columbiana O'Donoghue, 1922: synonym of Tenellia columbiana (O'Donoghue, 1922): synonym of Catriona columbiana (O'Donoghue, 1922)
 Amphorina horii (Baba, 1960): synonym of Eubranchus horii Baba, 1960
 Amphorina odhneri (Derjugin & Gurjanova, 1926): synonym of Eubranchus odhneri (Derjugin & Gurjanova, 1926)
 Amphorina pallida Eliot, 1906: synonym of Cuthona pallida (Eliot, 1906)

References

 Edmunds, M. & Kress, A. (1969). On the European species of Eubranchus (Mollusca: Opisthobranchia). Journal of the Marine Biological Association of the United Kingdom. 49(4): 879–912.

External links
 Quatrefages J.L.A. de. (1844). Sur les Gastéropodes Phlébentérés (Phlebenterata Nob.), ordre nouveau de la classe des Gastéropodes, proposé d'après l'examen anatomique et physiologique des genres Zéphyrine (Zephyrina Nob.), Actéon (Acteon Oken), Actéonie (Acteoniæ Nob.), Amphorine (Amphorina Nob.), Pavois (Pelta Nob.), Chalide (Chalidis Nob.). Annales des Sciences Naturelles. ser. 3, 1: 129-183, pls 3-6.
 

Eubranchidae